The 1969 Australian Grand Prix was a motor race held at Lakeside in Queensland, Australia on 2 February 1969. The race was promoted by the Queensland Motor Sports Club and was open to Australian National Formula cars and Australian Formula 2 cars. It was the thirty fourth Australian Grand Prix and was race five of the 1969 Tasman Championship.

New Zealander Chris Amon started the race from pole position and drove the fastest race lap on his way to a victory, with his British Scuderia Veloce teammate Derek Bell placed second. Leo Geoghegan was the first of the domestic based drivers in third position. Amon also won the 1969 Tasman Series.

Classification 

Results as follows:

Qualifying

Race

Notes
 Entries: 15
 Starters: 15
 Finishers: 8
 Pole position: Chris Amon, 52.3
 Winner's race time: 60m 12.8s
 Winner's average speed: 100.18 mph (161.219 k.p.h.)
 Fastest lap: Chris Amon, 52.8

References

External links

Grand Prix
Australian Grand Prix
Tasman Series
Sport in Brisbane
Australian Grand Prix